The Ireland women's national field hockey team is organised by Hockey Ireland and represents both the Republic of Ireland and Northern Ireland in international women's field hockey competitions, including the Women's Hockey World Cup and the Women's EuroHockey Nations Championship. They have previously competed in the Women's Intercontinental Cup, the Women's Hockey Champions Challenge, Women's FIH Hockey World League and the Women's FIH Hockey Series. On 2 March 1896, Ireland played England in the first ever women's international field hockey match. Ireland were finalists and silver medallists at the 2018 Women's Hockey World Cup and competed at the 2020 Olympic tournament.

History

Early years
The Irish Ladies Hockey Union was established in 1894. On 2 March 1896 they organised and hosted the first ever women's international field hockey match when Ireland defeated England 2–0 at Alexandra College.

Tournament record

Olympics
Ireland have qualified for the 2020 summer olympics Olympic Games. They were invited to enter the inaugural 1980 tournament but did not participate because of the boycott. Between 1991 and 2012 Ireland competed in Olympic qualifiers. In 2012 they reached the final of a qualifying tournament but lost 4–1 to Belgium. Ireland attempted to qualify for the 2016 Summer Olympics via the 2014–15 Women's FIH Hockey World League. However they failed to qualify after losing out to China in a penalty shoot-out during a tournament in Valencia.

World Cup
Early tournaments
Ireland have played in four Women's Hockey World Cups, making their debut in 1986. Ireland qualified for their first tournament after winning the 1983 Women's Intercontinental Cup. Ireland hosted the 1994 Women's Hockey World Cup and made their third appearance in 2002 after finishing fifth in the 2001 Women's Intercontinental Cup.

2018 Women's Hockey World Cup
Ireland were finalists and silver medallists at the 2018 Women's Hockey World Cup. Deirdre Duke scored twice against the United States as Ireland won their opening pool stage game 3–1. Shirley McCay was also on target for Ireland. In their second pool game against India, Anna O'Flanagan's goal secured a 1–0 win for Ireland and a place in the quarter-finals. Ireland lost their third pool game against England. However, after winning their first two games, they had already qualified for the knockout stages. The quarter-final against India finished 0–0 but Roisin Upton, Alison Meeke and Chloe Watkins were all on target as Ireland won the penalty shoot-out 3–1. Ireland coach Graham Shaw hailed Ayeisha McFerran's  performance in the penalty shoot-out after she saved three out of the four India penalty strokes. In the semi-final against Spain, O'Flanagan scored her second goal before Spain equalised and the game finished 1–1. In the subsequent penalty shoot-out, Ireland won 3–2, with Gillian Pinder scoring twice and McFerran again saving three penalty strokes. Despite losing the final 6–0 to the Netherlands, Ireland were acclaimed for their overall performance in the tournament. They had begun the tournament as underdogs, the second lowest seed. They were ranked 15th out of sixteen teams taking part. Their team was  made up of part-timers and amateurs while in the final they played a team of full-time professionals.  It was reported in The Irish Times that the players had to pay €550 to compete. Although this claim was subsequently denied by both Sport Ireland and the Minister for Transport, Tourism and Sport, Shane Ross. Following their appearance in the World Cup final, Ireland moved up to a best ever eighth position in the FIH World Rankings. Their previous highest ranking position was 14th.

EuroHockey Championships
Ireland competed in every Women's EuroHockey Nations Championship between 1984 and 2013. However, after finishing 7th in 2013, they were relegated to the second level, Women's EuroHockey Championship II. Ireland subsequently returned to the top level after winning the 2015 Women's EuroHockey Championship II, defeating the Czech Republic 5–0 in the final.

Women's Intercontinental Cup
Between 1983 and 2006 Ireland played regularly in the Women's Intercontinental Cup. Ireland qualified for the 1986 Women's Hockey World Cup after winning the 1983 Women's Intercontinental Cup. The team was captained by Margaret Gleghorne and also included Mary Geaney. Ireland qualified for the 2002 Women's Hockey World Cup after finishing 5th in the 2001 Women's Intercontinental Cup in controversial circumstances. Ireland played Lithuania in a fifth to eighth place classification match. The match finished 2–2 and Lithuania won the subsequent penalty shoot-out 6–5. However Ireland captain, Rachel Kohler, spotted that the penalty strokes were being taken in the wrong order. She was initially ignored by the match officials, but Ireland appealed and the tournament director ruled the shoot-out should be replayed the next day. However Lithuania refused to take part and withdrew from the tournament.  Ireland went on to defeat Scotland 2–1 in the fifth place play-off and were initially confirmed as the final qualifier from the tournament. Before the match the Lithuania team staged a sit down protest on the pitch. Lithuania lodged a further appeal to the FIH who then ordered that Ireland, Lithuania, India and the United States take part in a second qualification tournament. Lithuania were due to play India in a seventh and eighth place play-off before they withdrew. The United States had been unable to participate in the original tournament due to the disruption of airline schedules after the September 11 attacks. However Ireland in turn appealed to the Court of Arbitration for Sport who overruled the FIH decision and finally confirmed Ireland's place in the 2002 Women's Hockey World Cup.

Women's Hockey Champions Challenge
Between 2009 and 2014 Ireland enter teams in Women's Hockey Champions Challenge tournaments.

Women's FIH Hockey World League
Between 2012 and 2017 Ireland competed in the Women's FIH Hockey World League. In March 2015 they won a Round 2 tournament hosted in Dublin, defeating Canada in the final after a penalty shoot-out. Ireland attempted to qualify for the 2016 Summer Olympics via the 2014–15 Women's FIH Hockey World League. However they failed to qualify after losing out to China in a penalty shoot-out during the Semi-finals tournament in Valencia. In January 2017 they won a Round 2 tournament in Kuala Lumpur, defeating Malaysia 3–0 in the final with goals from Anna O'Flanagan, Katie Mullan and Zoe Wilson.  Ireland's seventh-place finish at the 2016–17 Women's FIH Hockey World League Semi-finals eventually saw them qualify for the 2018 Women's Hockey World Cup.

Women's FIH Hockey Series
During 2019, Ireland played in the Women's FIH Series.

Women's FIH Hockey Nations Cup

Invitational tournaments

Team

Current squad
Squad for the 2022 Women's FIH Hockey World Cup.

Head coach:  Sean Dancer

2018 Women's Hockey World Cup silver medallists

Olympians

The following Ireland internationals have also represented Great Britain at the Summer Olympics.

 Violet McBride – 1988
 Jackie McWilliams – 1992

Others 
Ireland field hockey internationals, Thelma Hopkins and Maeve Kyle, have also represented Great Britain and Ireland, respectively, at the Olympics. Both competed as track and field athletes.

  Thelma Hopkins – 1952, 1956
  Maeve Kyle – 1956, 1960, 1964

Coaches

Honours
Women's Hockey World Cup
Runners-up: 2018
Women's FIH Hockey World League Round 2
Winners: 2015 Dublin, 2017 Kuala Lumpur
Women's EuroHockey Championship II
Winners: 2015
Women's Intercontinental Cup
Winners: 1983
Women's Hockey Champions Challenge I
Runners-up: 2014
Women's FIH Hockey Series
Runners-up: 2019 Banbridge
Women's Four Nations Cup
Runners-up: 2017
Women's Field Hockey Olympic Qualifier
Runners-up: 2012

References

External links

FIH profile

 
 
European women's national field hockey teams
1896 establishments in Ireland